Statistics of Emperor's Cup in the 1989 season.

Overview
It was contested by 32 teams, and Nissan Motors won the championship.

Results

1st round
Nissan Motors 3–1 Tokai University
Cosmo Oil 0–0 (PK 2–0) Mitsubishi Motors
Honda 4–3 Tsukuba University
Sapporo Mazda 1–4 Yanmar Diesel
Yomiuri 4–0 Osaka Gas
Mitsubishi Chemical Kurosaki 2–5 Hitachi
Yawata Steel 1–0 Kyoto Shiko
Otsuka Pharmaceutical 1–2 Fujita Industries
Yamaha Motors 5–1 Yomiuri Junior
PJM Futures 5–0 TDK
Toshiba 1–0 NTT Kansai
Juntendo University 1–0 Furukawa Electric
Matsushita Electric 0–1 Mazda
Tanabe Pharmaceuticals 1–2 NKK
Meiji University 4–2 YKK
Fujieda City Hall 0–2 All Nippon Airways

2nd round
Nissan Motors 4–0 Cosmo Oil
Honda 1–3 Yanmar Diesel
Yomiuri 1–0 Hitachi
Yawata Steel 1–3 Fujita Industries
Yamaha Motors 1–0 PJM Futures
Toshiba 3–0 Juntendo University
Mazda 1–0 NKK
Meiji University 0–3 All Nippon Airways

Quarterfinals
Nissan Motors 1–0 Yanmar Diesel
Yomiuri 1–0 Fujita Industries
Yamaha Motors 2–1 Toshiba
Mazda 1–2 All Nippon Airways

Semifinals
Nissan Motors 1–0 Yomiuri
Yamaha Motors 1–1 (PK 4–2) All Nippon Airways

Final

Nissan Motors 3–2 Yamaha Motors
Nissan Motors won the championship Excluded from the Asian Cup Winners' Cup 1990.

References
 NHK

Emperor's Cup
Emperor's Cup
1990 in Japanese football